Ptilotus exaltatus, more commonly known as pink mulla mulla, is an erect annual herb endemic to large parts of arid and semi-arid Australia. It grows throughout most areas of Australia except the Nullarbor Plain, occurring geographically above a line drawn from Perth to Esperance. The species was first observed and described in 1810, and comprehensively catalogued in 1971.

Taxonomy
Initial taxonomic classification of the Ptilotus genus was carried out by Gerhard Benl, a botanist based in Munich, Germany, in 1971. Benl's research documented all observed morphological variation by the physical description of new subspecies and varieties of the genus. Prior to 2007, a complete botanical key for the genus Ptilotus was yet to be published. This was due to a variety of factors including the subtle morphological differences between plants, and a large number of characteristics common to several subspecies and varieties. In 2007, molecular phylogenetic analysis of 14 Ptilotus species was carried out which resulted in Ptilotus exaltatus and Ptilotus nobilis having no reliable morphological characteristics on which to separate the two. Additionally, based on the lack of genetic diversity or structure between the two, it was suggested that Ptilotus exaltatus and Ptilotus nobilis were conspecific. However, whether the two plants are in fact two different species has been a consistent point of contention. Later research has challenged this assumption of conspecificity. Benl differentiated the two species by the odour of the leaves, and flower colour (pale yellow or purple) has been argued as a point of difference. In 2018 research was undertaken which suggested that, on the basis of multiple morphological characters as well as ecological and geographic partitioning, Ptilotus exaltatus exists distinct of Ptilotus nobilis. Morphologically, Ptilotus exaltatus was differentiated based on the adaxial covering of hairs on the base of the tepals, which are straighter, more sparse and more erect than the flowers of Ptilotus nobilis. Additionally, the flowers of Ptilotus nobilis were often coloured green with a slight tinge of pink, whereas Ptilotus exaltatus is consistently pink or purple. The two plants also have different floral scents. This taxonomic classification is important as it involves the fundamental principle of categorising living organisms in order to better understand the natural world. Given Australia's unique, endemic flora, the need for specific and detailed taxonomy is paramount.

Description 
This robust perennial or ephemeral herb is one of the largest erect herbs of the Mulla Mullas and grows to heights of around 1.2 metres, although the average height of a single specimen is 60–80 centimetres. The leaf coverage on the plant is leathery light green to blue green with occasionally reddish tones and covers the entire stem until the emergence of the flower at the top of the stem. It is initially structured in rosette form, that is, a modified stem in which the internode gaps between the leaves do not expand. From April to November, Ptilotus exaltatus flowers and large, conical heads up to 10 centimetres in size adorn the top of the plant. The flowers are generally a purple-pink colour with thin, pointed petals surrounded by white fluffy hairs.

Distribution and habitat 
The genus Ptilotus, compromising around 100 species is almost completely confined to Australia, with a one species extending to Timor and certain surrounding islands. Ptilotus exaltatus itself is endemic to much of mainland Australia and grows abundantly throughout the entirety of the country, favouring arid and semi-arid climates for ideal growth. Large parts of Australia in which the plant grows experience frosts during winter months, which Ptilotus can withstand by going dormant for short periods of time. Conversely, they are extremely heat and drought tolerant although their lifespan is relatively short – they exist healthily for only a few years. Given the nature of weather patterns in arid Australia – often involving long dry patches followed by brief downpours of rain, Ptilotus exaltatus most often grows immediately after precipitation. Large numbers of the species have been observed to sprout after rainfall in desert areas, and the species is adept at surviving with lower water requirements after initial sprouting.

Growth and development 
Ptilotus exaltatus is a highly desirable Australian Native plant due to its abundant and colourful flowers, but its horticultural potential is limited by poor germination. The seed dispersal unit of the plant is a 2 x 1.5-millimetre nut enclosed by the perianth, which prevents germination. Removal of the perianth sheath surrounding the seed stimulates a 60–80% increase in germination. Germination does not seem to be affected by temperature or light, and two main barriers to germination have been identified – the surrounding perianth tissue and the testa prevent germination in the majority of cases of uncleaned seeds. The removal of these objects which encircle the seed led to a significant increase in germination. Application of slow-release fertiliser as well as application of liquid, nitrogen-based fertiliser promoted plant growth and early flowering. In order to promote rapid growth and flower development while maintaining control of the stem height to ensure a compact plant has been a challenging aspect of successful commercial cultivation of the pink mulla mulla. Research has shown, however, that substantial application of different nitrogen and superphosphate-based fertilisers can result in satisfactory growth control for more widespread horticultural production. Ptilotus exaltatus is known to survive in high-phosphorus soil environments without succumbing to phosphorus toxicity, and as such has been declared a phosphorus hyperaccumulater. It is able to tolerate very high phosphorus levels in soil without suffering a decrease in the leaf and shoot dry weight – a key indicator of plant health. It is able to do so by preferentially accumulating phosphorus in mesophyll cells, forming calcium crystals, and balancing the increased cellular phosphorus by elevating potassium and reducing sulphur levels. Ptilotus exaltatus grows in a variety of habitats including, grasslands, eucalypt woodlands and acacia shrublands. It is found readily on red sands, brown sands, red sandy clays, calcareous loams and stony or gravelly soil. Ptilotus exaltatus thrives best in full sunlight, with 6–8 hours of sunlight per day best for ideal growth. Additionally, given their drought tolerance, minimal watering is required.

Cultivation and uses 
The principal use for the species is as a garden plant. The vibrant colours and strong stems provide a favourable aesthetic and their suitability in most Australian conditions means they are appropriate choices for gardens across the country. There is also interest in Ptilotus exaltatus in overseas horticultural industries. Experiments in the growth of Ptilotus exaltatus under Central European Conditions indicate an 85% success rate for germination of cleaned seeds under such conditions. Growth tests throughout the year indicated that while it can grow successfully all year round in Australian arid and semi-arid conditions, under Central European conditions, cultivation only resulted in healthy and suitable flowers from the end of April/beginning of May through to the end of September/beginning of October, as conditions were too cold during winter months in the Northern Hemisphere. The Pink Mulla Mulla attracts bees and butterflies leading to an overall increase in garden health when planted in personal gardens. The plant is increasingly being grown in Western Australia in order to produce flowers for export, due to the increasing demand for Australian native plants worldwide. When experimenting with differing quantities of nitrogen, phosphorus and potassium and assessing the effect on growth, the largest amount of applied nitrogen gave the maximum dry weight of shoots.

References 

exaltatus
Flora of New South Wales
Flora of South Australia
Flora of Queensland
Flora of the Northern Territory
Eudicots of Western Australia
Taxa named by Christian Gottfried Daniel Nees von Esenbeck
Plants described in 1845